This is a list of notable players for Chelsea Football Club, whether or not they have a Wikipedia article. It generally includes only those players who made more than 100 appearances for the club, but also those who fell just short of 100 and made a notable contribution, members of the club's first ever team or those voted Player of the Year.

Key
Statistics are correct up to and including the match played on 7 March 2023. Where a player left the club permanently after this date, his statistics are updated to his date of leaving.

Players

Dates and figures are for the individual's career with Chelsea only.

Figures are for all competitive matches and include substitute appearances.

 Bold indicates players currently playing for the club.

Annual awards
Key
 A number in brackets beside a player's name indicates the number of times they have received the award.

Player of the Year

Players' Player of the Year

Young Player of the Year

Academy Player of the Year

Goal of the Year

List of captains

Notable captains
  Indicates captains who won the League in the Second Division.

See also
List of Chelsea F.C. players (1–24 appearances)
List of Chelsea F.C. players (25–99 appearances)

References
General
 Player profiles
 Player database
 
 List of all Chelsea players past and present and appearance data

Specific

 
Chelsea F.C. players
Players
Association football player non-biographical articles